Textile Mill Supply Company Building is a historic factory building located at Charlotte, Mecklenburg County, North Carolina. It was designed by Lockwood, Greene & Co. and built in 1922.  It is a three-story, ten-bay wide by-five-bay deep, red brick structure with a full basement. It has large rectangular windows and pine post-and-beam interior framing.  The building housed the Textile Mill Supply Company that sold and distributed supplies essential to the operations of textile mills in the Piedmont sections of the Carolinas.

It was added to the National Register of Historic Places in 1999.

References

Industrial buildings and structures on the National Register of Historic Places in North Carolina
Industrial buildings completed in 1922
Buildings and structures in Charlotte, North Carolina
National Register of Historic Places in Mecklenburg County, North Carolina